The Roman Catholic Diocese of Hamilton in Bermuda is a diocese of the Latin Church of the Catholic Church in North America. The diocese comprises the entirety of the dependency of Bermuda. The diocese is a suffragan of the Archdiocese of Nassau, and a member of the Antilles Episcopal Conference.

The diocese of Hamilton was erected in 1953 out of the Archdiocese of Halifax-Yarmouth in Nova Scotia, Canada (Bermuda having historically been part of British North America) as the Prefecture Apostolic of Bermuda Islands. It was elevated to an apostolic vicariate in January 1956 and to the Diocese of Hamilton in Bermuda in June 1967.

Ordinaries
Robert Dehler (1954–1966)
Bernard Murphy (1967–1974)
Brian Hennessy (1975–1995)
Robert Kurtz (1995–2015)
Wiesław Śpiewak (2015–)

References

External links

Catholic Church in Bermuda
Roman Catholic dioceses in North America
Roman Catholic Ecclesiastical Province of Nassau